Anita Groener (born 1958, Veldhoven, Netherlands) is an artist based in Dublin, Ireland. She makes paintings, monumental site-specific drawings, film and animation which she exhibits internationally. Groener graduated in 1980 with a BA from the Mollerinstituut Moller Institute in Tilburg, the Netherlands. She received an MA from the Hogeschool voor de Kunsten, Arnhem, the Netherlands, in 1982, and moved to Dublin in the same year. In 2005 she was elected by her peers to be a member of Aosdána, the major cultural body for the arts in Ireland. Her work is represented in the collections of The Irish Museum of Modern Art; The Arts Council of Ireland; the State Art Collection, Ireland; C21 Museum Hotels, USA; VU University Medical Centre, Amsterdam; DELA Insurance, the Netherlands; Sun Communities USA; The Law Library of Ireland; The National Drawing Archive Ireland; the Contemporary Irish Art Society; AIB Bank; and ABN-AMRO Bank and private collections in the US, Ireland, the Netherlands, Germany, Italy, Switzerland, Belgium.

Career 

Groener is currently best known for her drawings and drawing-like paintings, sometimes with cut-outs pinned to a wall and often of very large scale. Groener's work over the decade, 2005 – 2015, is simultaneously sparse and seemingly overpopulated. For example, of the eponymous artwork in her 2013 show State at the Royal Hibernian Academy (RHA), Dublin, art critic Cristín Leach Hughes wrote, "Nearly 2,000 tiny individuals are trapped, held with pins. Stand back and they form the population of a spotlit planet, a floating sphere that points to man's ultimate insignificance. Step forward and they argue for the intimate importance of our presence in the scheme of things."

Groener also works with film and animation, as in video pieces in her Royal Hibernian Academy show Crossings in 2006, or her graphic animation Somewhere Else, shown in the Kilkenny Arts Festival in 2012.

In contrast to her later, more restrained pieces, those writing on early displays of Groener's work in Dublin were struck by the forceful imagery and execution, and greeted them as roughly belonging to the (New) Expressionist and possibly Cobra traditions The link between earlier and later works can perhaps be found in large, largely monochromatic paintings such as Trajectory, 2004, or Crossing, 2006. These are gesturally expressive but more patterned than the earlier works, which tended to contain human- or animal-like elements which were proportionately more dominant.

Writers and critics tracked these changes in Groener's work. "Repetitive visual patterns and images evoke the repetitive patterns of human communication. Rather than diminishing the significance of such routine intercourse, the effect underlines the latent emotional charge of apparently banal exchanges. Behind the language of habit, there is a tacit awareness of separation and change, of loss and distance, of time passing." Similarly, critic Mark Ewart wrote with respect to Groener's Heartlands show at the Rubicon Gallery, Dublin, "The first thing to hit you about these 28 paintings is, paradoxically, their sparsity."

A leitmotif in Groener's work has been the psychological. Ciarán Benson (now Emeritus Professor of Psychology at University College Dublin), when writing about Crossings, concurred with Groener's visual imagery of road and journey to depict the evolution of the self. "The lines are paths of experience" – Martí Peran on Groener's work. Groener's approach resonates with Freudian or Lacanian theory, with works signalling the danger of losing the individual in the collective or the unknown, but with the same or related works pointing towards disconnect or disintegration at the level of the person. Patrick T. Murphy, Director of the RHA, writing about Groener's State at the RHA, puts it thus: "...the universal task of situating the self upon this earth. How do we figure ourselves within the societal, the geopolitical, the global?"

Groener has stated about her development as an artist and her way of working, "I used to wonder what exactly art was for me. I've come to the conclusion that it is a physical manifestation of my thinking, of my experience of the world."

Academic influence 
After her move to Dublin, Groener appears to have found early, ready acceptance among her peers. She was elected to the committee of the Independent Artists in 1985, and the same year she was instrumental in bringing a show of ten Dutch artists to Ireland. She was one of only 120 artists, composers and a calligrapher included in The Great Book of Ireland published in 1991. She began lecturing at the Dublin Institute of Technology (DIT) in the Department of Fine Art in 1982. She was Course Leader for Fine Art during two periods and was head of department from 2004 to 2006. Groener left DIT to pursue her own practice in 2014.

Bibliography 
Wolin, J.(ed) and Marle, T(trans). (2009). Tipping/point. 

Kissane, S., Wolin, J., Lynch, S., Sirr, P. (2018). The Past is a Foreign Country. Limerick City Gallery of Art. 

Benson, C., Hanrahan S. (2006) Crossing. Royal Hibernian Academy.

References

External links
 Artist Website
 Aosdána
 Representing Gallery
 Irish Museum of Modern Art Collection
 Arts Council of Ireland Collection

1958 births
Living people
Aosdána members
Irish women painters
Dutch women painters
People from Dún Laoghaire
20th-century Dutch painters
21st-century Dutch painters
20th-century Dutch women artists
21st-century Dutch women artists
20th-century Irish painters
21st-century Irish painters